Ramón Enrique Maradiaga Chávez (born 30 October 1954 in Amapala, Honduras) is a retired Honduran football player and manager.

Club career
Nicknamed Primitivo, Maradiaga has played as a midfielder amongst others for F.C. Motagua as well as Salvadoran giants Águila and Alianza. He also had half a season in Europe, playing 15 games in the Spanish Segunda División for Tenerife in 1984. He scored 23 goals in total for Motagua, making him one of the most prolific midfielders in the club's history.

He finished his career at Tela Timsa after the 1991–1992 season and took the reins at the club the next season, also changing their name to Petrotela.

International career
A stocky defensive midfielder, Maradiaga represented Honduras at the 1977 FIFA World Youth Championship. He went on to play for his country in 24 FIFA World Cup qualification matches and he was captain of the Honduras squad that took part in the 1982 FIFA World Cup.

Managerial career
After his playing career ended, he has been rather successful as a coach. He has coached Motagua, Victoria, Águila and the Honduras national football team.

Guatemala national team
He had been in charge of the Guatemala national football team until 2006, but his contract was terminated after they failed to reach the 2006 FIFA World Cup qualification play-offs. He returned however for the 2010 FIFA World Cup qualification in March 2008 but was dismissed by the Chapines for a second time in October 2008.

He resigned in October 2009 as coach of Real España and in September 2011, he was dismissed as coach of Motagua, with whom he won four league titles. He was revealed as the new Marathón coach in January 2012 but was replaced by Manuel Keosseián in August 2012.

In September 2012, Maradiaga was presented as the new manager of Guatemalan giants Municipal.

El Salvador national team

In September 2015 he accepted the position of coach of the El Salvador national football team. On 6 September 2016, his team revealed that they had all been approached, and had turned down, an offer to ensure that their result against Canada saw Honduras progress to the next round for the 2018 FIFA World Cup qualification, but Maradiaga was later fined 20,000 Swiss francs and banned from football for two years for not disclosing the approach.

International recognition
On 7 January 2011 the International Federation of Football History & Statistics published a list of the World's Best Coach of the 1st Decade (2001–2010) and Maradiaga appeared on the list ranking 167th.

Personal life
Primi is married to Lesby Vargas, who is 19 years younger than him. They have two sons, Martín and Javier.

Honours and awards

Club
C.D. Motagua
Liga Profesional de Honduras (1):  1978–79

C.D. Real Espana
Liga Profesional de Honduras (1):  1990–91

References

External links

 Ramón Maradiaga: “No creo en cábalas ni soy supersticioso – La Prensa 

1954 births
Living people
People from Valle Department
Association football midfielders
Honduran footballers
Honduras international footballers
1982 FIFA World Cup players
F.C. Motagua players
CD Tenerife players
C.D. Águila footballers
Alianza F.C. footballers
Real C.D. España players
Liga Nacional de Fútbol Profesional de Honduras players
Honduran expatriate footballers
Expatriate footballers in Spain
Expatriate footballers in El Salvador
Honduran expatriate sportspeople in Spain
Honduran expatriate sportspeople in El Salvador
Honduran expatriate sportspeople in Guatemala
Honduran football managers
F.C. Motagua managers
2001 Copa América managers
Expatriate football managers in El Salvador
Guatemala national football team managers
C.D. Marathón managers
Honduras national football team managers
C.D. Águila managers
Real C.D. España managers
C.S.D. Municipal managers
Juticalpa F.C. managers
El Salvador national football team managers
Expatriate football managers in Guatemala
CONCACAF Championship-winning players